Wistaria Provincial Park is a provincial park in the Canadian province of British Columbia, located 60 km southwest of Burns Lake and approximately 80 km southeast of Houston, BC.

Climate
Protected by the Coast Mountains and with a high plateau, the climate is subarctic continental (Köppen: Dfc) with long cold winters and warm summers, but spring can be very dry.

Recreation
The 40-hectare park provides boating and fishing access to Ootsa Lake. There is also a picnic area.

References

External links
 BC Parks - Wistaria Provincial Park

Provincial parks of British Columbia
Regional District of Bulkley-Nechako
1981 establishments in British Columbia
Protected areas established in 1981